The Jiangxi Business Post, also known as Jiangxi Business News, was a Nanchang-based Chinese-language financial newspaper published in China. It was sponsored by Jiangxi Provincial Supply and Marketing Cooperative (江西省供销合作社) on September 1, 1995. The Post was a provincial-level newspaper.

Edited and published by Jiangxi Business Post Agency,  Jiangxi Business Post unveiled the Business Weekly (商业周刊) in July 2005.

History
In January 2005, Jiangxi Business Post was switched to a weekly publication. On January 1, 2019, the Post ceased publication.

References

Defunct newspapers published in China
Publications established in 1995
1995 establishments in China
Publications disestablished in 2019